A danseur noble traditionally was a male ballet dancer who projected great nobility of character. Over the last century the term has been used to define a male principal dancer  who performs at the highest theatrical level combining grace with ability. Some use danseur noble as the masculine equivalent to a Prima Ballerina.

Notable examples

Historical and retired 
  
Gaétan Vestris
Charles Le Picq
Vaslav Nijinsky
Léonide Massine
Serge Lifar
Adolph Bolm
Mikhail Mordkin
Anton Dolin
Theodore Kosloff
Pavel Gerdt
Vakhtang Chabukiani
Pyotr Gusev
Asaf Messerer
Roman Jasiński
Igor Youskevitch 
Vasily Tikhomirov
Aleksey Yermolayev
Nikolai Fadeyechev
Sergei Filin
Askold Makarov
Konstantin Sergeyev
Erik Bruhn
Rudolf Nureyev
Edward Villella
Jean-Pierre Bonnefoux
Nicolas Le Riche
Carlos Acosta
Jean Guizerix
Vladimir Vasiliev
Cyril Atanassoff
Mikhail Baryshnikov
Henning Kronstam
Jacques d'Amboise
Fernando Bujones
Robert Helpmann
Michael Somes
Reid Anderson
Anthony Dowell
Wayne Eagling
José Martinez
Ivan Nagy
Peter Martins
Laurent Hilaire
Julio Bocca
Nikolay Tsiskaridze
Manuel Legris
Johan Kobborg
Ethan Stiefel
Tamas Detrich
Maris Liepa
Yuri Soloviev
Alexander Godunov
Irek Mukhamedov
Farukh Ruzimatov
Vladimir Malakhov

Current  
  
Roberto Bolle
Mikhail Baryshnikov
José Manuel Carreño
David Hallberg
Marcelo Gomes
Vladimir Yaroshenko
Federico Bonelli
Sergei Polunin
Thiago Soares
Rupert Pennefather
Igor Zelensky
Mathieu Ganio
Stéphane Bullion
Evan McKie
Matthew Golding
Igor Kolb
Leonid Sarafanov
Vladimir Shklyarov
Friedemann Vogel

Ballet occupations